AB Andromedae (AB And) is a binary star in the constellation Andromeda. Paul Guthnick and Richard Prager discovered that the star is an eclipsing binary in 1927. Its maximum apparent visual magnitude is 9.49 but shows a variation in brightness down to a magnitude of 10.46 in a periodic cycle of roughly 8 hours. The observed variability is typical of W Ursae Majoris variable stars, so the two stars in this system form a contact binary.

System
The observed spectral type of both stars in this system is G5, and one of them is a main sequence star very similar to the sun. They are orbiting so close that their envelopes touch each other. This is a dynamically stable phase that should last until one of the two stars leaves the main sequence.

The system could also host a third body with an orbital period of 19,046 days, with a minimum mass of 0.007  and an eccentricity of 0.22, but not all data collected in time are consistent with this hypothesis.

Variability
The two stars eclipse each other during their orbit, but they have an elongated shape so they show a constant variation instead of discrete eclipses. Anyway, a periodicity can be seen clearly, but it changes with time; the period shows a long-term trend and a periodic modulation of 7,000 days. The effects responsible for this behaviour could be a third body in the system, magnetic interaction between two stars, mass transfer from one star to the other, mass loss of the system, and recently even an internal mechanism in the touching envelopes have been proposed.

References

Andromeda (constellation)
Andromedae, AB
Durchmusterung objects
J23113209+3653351
W Ursae Majoris variables
114508
G-type main-sequence stars